Strain Mountain is a mountain in the Central New York region of New York. It is located northeast of South Worcester, New York.

References

Mountains of Otsego County, New York
Mountains of New York (state)